Hutton-le-Hole is a small village and civil parish in the Ryedale district of North Yorkshire, England, about  north-west of Pickering. It is a popular scenic village within the North York Moors National Park. Sheep roam the streets at will.

History
The village appears in the Domesday Book of 1086 as Hoton. Since then it has been known as Hege-Hoton, Hoton under Heg and Hewton. The name Hutton-le-Hole means place of the burial ground near the hollow, but the full name appears only in the 19th century.

Near the end of the 13th century, the village was granted to St Mary's Abbey, York.

In the 1600s the village was mainly inhabited by Quakers working as weavers or in agriculture. The Quaker evangelist John Richardson died there in 1753 at the age of 87. About four miles away in Kirbymoorside stands an old building that began as a Quaker Meeting House in 1690; it was much modified in 1790 and extended about 1810. It remains a Grade II listed building. John Richardson was buried at the Meeting's burial site. There was a Meeting House in Hutton-le-Hole as well, built in 1698 but turned into a residence in 1859. Interments there continued until 1868.
 

By 1831, Hutton-le-Hole was part of the Anglican Lastingham parish. The "Township of Hutton-le-Hole" was receiving education funding from a charity owned by John Stockton in 1914. The first schoolhouse was built in 1845 and replaced in 1875 by a Grade II listed building, but this is now a holiday let.

In 1901, the old building of the Zion Chapel still stood, but was no longer in use. The village bought it and pulled it down in 1934 when a new church, St Chad's, was built; this still stands and forms part of the Benefice of Lastingham. In earlier years, services had been held in the schoolhouse.

Altogether the village has 29 properties historically listed as Grade II, many of them from the 18th century. One is a K6 telephone kiosk designed in 1935, another a sundial installed in 1833.

The world championships in the board game Nine men's morris took place annually at the Ryedale Folk Museum in Hutton-le-Hole until 1997.

Tourism
In the Victorian period, gentry saw village as "ill-planned and untidy" and "overcrowded [with] homes of weavers, smallholders and labourers.... Manure was piled everywhere and the beck was the common sewer."

Hutton-le-Hole now features among the "20 most beautiful villages in the UK and Ireland" according to Condé Nast Traveler and is much visited. It has a large pay-and-display car park at the north end. The National Park Authority recommends visits to the Hutton le Hole Craft Workshops and Ryedale Folk Museum, followed by a two-mile walk to Lastingham and its ancient church, St Mary's.

The museum covers 13 rescued and reconstructed historic buildings, including an Iron Age round house, period shops, thatched cottages, an Elizabethan manor house, barns and workshops, to display the lives of ordinary people up to the present day. There is a cafe, a shop, a gift shop, and in season craft workshops. The folk museum also has the photographic studio of William Hayes, believed to be the oldest daylight photographic studio in England, set up in the early 20th century. The studio was built in 1902 in Monkgate, York, and donated to the museum in 1991.

Geography

The stream Hutton Beck wends its way through the middle of the village, criss-crossed by footpaths and wooden bridges. One of the bridges was replaced in 2002 by the North York Moors National Park Authority when pedestrian traffic across increased dramatically, after the village green was designated as a right of way. The stream splits the village green, whose grass is kept short by sheep. Hutton Beck flows into the River Rye via Catter Beck and the River Seven.

Gallery

References

External links

Hutton-le-Hole

Civil parishes in North Yorkshire
Scenic routes in the United Kingdom
Villages in North Yorkshire